Tomiko Okhee Lee is a South Korean actress and producer. She has starred in several television shows and movies, such as The Byrds of Paradise (1993–94), Soap Girl (2002), The Last Eve (2005) and two episodes of Lost (2004–2010).  She was also an executive producer on both Soap Girl and The Last Eve.

References

External links
 

Living people
Year of birth missing (living people)
20th-century South Korean actresses
21st-century South Korean actresses
South Korean film actresses
South Korean television actresses
South Korean film producers
South Korean women film producers